Susupillo is a mountain with an archaeological site of the same name in the Andes of Peru, about  high. It is situated in the Huánuco Region, Huamalíes Province, Tantamayo District.

It was declared a National Cultural Heritage of Peru by Resolución Directoral No. 533/INC on June 18, 2002.

See also 
 Anku
 Isog
 Piruro
 Huankarán

References 

Mountains of Peru
Mountains of Huánuco Region
Archaeological sites in Huánuco Region
Archaeological sites in Peru